Alan Wilfred Bishop (27 May 1920 – 30 June 1988) was a British geotechnical engineer and academic, working at Imperial College London.

He was known for the Bishop's method of analysing soil slopes. After his graduation from Emmanuel College, Cambridge, Bishop worked under Alec Skempton and obtained his PhD in 1952 with his thesis title being: The stability of earth dams. He worked extensively in the field of experimental Soil mechanics and developed apparati for soil testing, such as the triaxial test and the ring shear.

His contribution to the science was widely acknowledged and he was invited in 1966 to deliver the 6th Rankine Lecture of the British Geotechnical Association titled: The strength of soils as engineering materials.

Nowadays, a part of the Soil Mechanics Laboratories at Imperial College is named after him in recognition of his long-time work at the College.

See also
 Department of Civil and Environmental Engineering, Imperial College London
 Slope stability analysis

References

External links
 Obituary 
 The Skempton and Bishop Archives 

1920 births
1988 deaths
Academics of Imperial College London
Fellows of the Royal Academy of Engineering
Geotechnical engineers
Rankine Lecturers
Alumni of Imperial College London
Alumni of Emmanuel College, Cambridge
English civil engineers